Digital Tears: E-Mail from Purgatory is 2004 album by underground rapper MF Grimm. The LP is Grimm's second solo album and the first to be credited to both GM Grimm and the Monsta Island Czars moniker Jet Jaguar. Grimm recorded the entire album over a two-day period, and wrote the album and composed the drum beats on a portable drum machine while serving his life sentence in prison. This album is the darkest in Grimm's catalog and reflects the environment surrounding him during the composition. It was the first release after Grimm's release from prison.

Most of the production work was handled by Looie II and Zero Point, with two tracks produced by J-Zone. Although the album includes samples from the film Godzilla vs. Megalon and one production from X-Ray, there are no other references to the Monsta Island Czars (other than Grimm's references to himself as "Jet Jaguar"). The album also includes three spoken-word interludes performed by Monte Smith and produced by DJ Soundmachine.

Like The Downfall of Ibliys: A Ghetto Opera, Digital Tears: E-mail from Purgatory was reissued in 2010 after being out of print for many years.

Singles
"Taken" b/w "Dancin'" (both produced by J-Zone) was released as a 12" vinyl single December 2003 in promotion of the album.

Track listing

References

External links
 

2004 albums
MF Grimm albums
Albums produced by J-Zone